Pinang Tunggal is a small town located at the northern part of Seberang Perai Utara district, Pulau Pinang, Malaysia.

References

North Seberang Perai District
Towns in Penang